"I Wonder" is a 1944 song written and originally performed by Pvt. Cecil Gant.  The original version was released on the Bronze label, before Gant re-recorded it for the Gilt-Edge label in Los Angeles.  The record made it to number one on the Juke Box Race Records chart and was Pvt. Gant's most successful release. In February 1945, pianist, Roosevelt Sykes hit number one with his version of the song.  Roosevelt Sykes version is notable in that it replaced Pvt. Gant's version, at number one on the Juke Box Race Records chart.

Other cover versions
Also in 1945, vocalist Warren Evans reached number six on the Juke Box Chart with his version of song.
Also in 1945, Louis Armstrong recorded his own version of "I Wonder" which peaked at number three on the Juke Box Chart.
Brenda Lee released a version as the B-side of "My Whole World Is Falling Down" in July 1963. It reached No. 25 on the Billboard Hot 100 later that year.
Etta Jones included it on her 1962 album Lonely and Blue.
Vikki Carr - Color Her Great! (1963).
Aretha Franklin from the album Aretha Arrives (1967).
American R&B and boogie-woogie pianist and singer Little Willie Littlefield recorded a version for his 1997 album The Red One.
Humble Pie recorded a slow blues/rock version for their Smokin' release in 1972.
Tony Bennett and k.d. lang – A Wonderful World (2002)

See also
 List of Billboard number-one R&B singles of the 1940s

References

1944 songs
Roosevelt Sykes songs
Louis Armstrong songs
Little Willie Littlefield songs
Brenda Lee songs